Karl Kodat (10 February 1943 – 29 February 2012) was an Austrian footballer who played at both professional and international levels, as a striker.

Career
Born in Vienna, Kodat played at professional level in Austria and Belgium for Austria Wien, Austria Salzburg and Royal Antwerp.

He also earned five caps for Austria in 1971.

Later life and death
Kodat died on 29 February 2012, at the age of 69.

References

1943 births
2012 deaths
Austrian footballers
Austria international footballers
FK Austria Wien players
Royal Antwerp F.C. players
Association football forwards
Austrian expatriate footballers
Expatriate footballers in Belgium
Austrian expatriates in Belgium